Yaroslav Stepanovych Kutsyaba (born 12 April 1989 in Stoyantsi, Radekhiv Raion, Lviv Oblast, Ukrainian SSR) is a professional Ukrainian football midfielder.

Career
Yaroslav Kutsyaba played on loan for Ukrainian Second League club MFC Mykolaiv. He is the product of the Karpaty Lviv Youth School System.

External links 
 Website Karpaty Profile
 Profile on EUFO
 Profile on Football Squads
 Player page on Official FFU Site 
 

1989 births
Living people
Ukrainian footballers
FC Karpaty Lviv players
FC Karpaty-2 Lviv players
MFC Mykolaiv players
FC Prykarpattia Ivano-Frankivsk (2004) players
FC Lviv players
Association football midfielders
Sportspeople from Lviv Oblast